Terrorism in Ecuador is a rare occurrence as the country, despite recurrent periods of economic and political instability, has been traditionally known as a peaceful state in Latin America, unlike its neighbor states; Peru and Colombia, which have suffered widespread violence by insurgent, paramilitary and drug trafficking organizations (all using terror tactics) in different degrees for more than fifty years.

Attacks in Ecuador have traditionally been carried out by small domestic organizations (both known and anonymous) as well as, in a lesser degree, foreign Colombian groups operating within Ecuador's borders. A number of terror organizations have been inactive for several years.

Terror groups
Domestic terrorist groups present in Ecuador, although some have been operationally inactive in the last few years, include the Popular Combatants Group (PCG), the Revolutionary Militia of the People, the Marxist-Leninist Party of Ecuador, and the Alfarista Liberation Army.

Foreign groups include the Colombian groups Revolutionary Armed Forces of Colombia (FARC) and National Liberation Army (ELN).

Terror attacks

1970s
September 1, 1978 – eight people were wounded and heavy material damage was sustained from a bomb left at a public phone in the offices of El Universo newspaper in the coastal city of Guayaquil. The attack occurred during the interval months between the first and the second round of presidential elections, a tense political period which marked the transition from military to civilian rule.
June 18, 1979 – the house of President-elect Jaime Roldós Aguilera in Guayaquil was reportedly machine-gunned by unknown assailants.

1980s
November 26, 1982 – an unidentified individual threw a suitcase bomb with a fuze inside the Israeli Embassy in Quito (located in the third floor of a building) and fled. Policemen Manuel Jiménez Soto and Víctor Jiménez Torres took the suitcase and attempted to take it downstairs to the street, but the bomb blew up when they were just 15 feet (five meters) away from the entrance. Jiménez Soto was instantly killed and Jiménez Torres later died from his injuries at a hospital, while a woman was wounded. Israeli ambassador Eliecer Armon declared that "it wasn't hard to guess who were responsible". No threats or unusual activity were reported beforehand. No authorship could be determined. 
May 1983 – the buildings of the Foreign, Health, and Social Welfare ministries in Quito were reportedly bombed, with no information on casualties or authorship.
January 28, 1984 – three pamphlet bombs detonated at the bus terminal in the mountain city of Cuenca. The leaflets were authored by self-defined Montoneros Alfaristas and called for a boycott of next day's general elections, which resulted in the election of León Febres Cordero; a conservative politician who became known for cracking down on left-wing subversive groups.
May 24, 1984 – in the third anniversary of President Roldós' death in a plane crash, pamphlet bombs exploded near the US Embassy and in the Metropolitan Cathedral of Quito, with the leaflets accusing US President Ronald Reagan and the CIA of being responsible for the Roldós' plane crash. No victims were reported.
January 9, 1985 – an accidental explosion in the Cochapamba neighborhood of Quito killed two members of Alfaro Vive Carajo. A heavy arsenal was later discovered at the site; in addition to propaganda material, instructive guerrilla handbooks, camouflage clothes and other equipment.
July 25, 1986 – two foreign members of Alfaro Vive Carajo; Diego de Jesús Pérez (Colombian) and Patricia Román (Chilean), were detained after a failed attempt at bombing an Ecuadorian Institute of Telecommunications (now CNT) ground station. The attack was botched after a shootout with security guards watching over the telecommunications tower. The subversives were also reportedly planning armed robberies on three banks.
April 7, 1987 – an attack with explosives occurred at the headquarters of the Provincial Transit Authority of Pichincha in Quito. According to then-Minister of Government Luis Robles Plaza, "an escalation of violence has presented in the country and it's necessary to stop it". Damages to twelve patrol cars were reported and Alfaro Vive Carajo claimed authorship through leaflets found at the site of the attack.
June 19, 1989 – a homemade bomb exploded outside a branch of Citibank in the mountain city of Ambato. Only material damage was reported. Despite a claim by the National Police of Ecuador that they had a description of a suspect, no further details are available. No group claimed responsibility, but police sources speculated of the Revolutionary Youth Group or the Democratic People's Movement (a now-defunct legal political party). The attack occurred in a context of a dispute between the government of Rodrigo Borja (a social democrat) and Citibank over an alleged move by the bank to retain $80 million in its deposits to repay a loan.
October 26, 1989 – five rounds of automatic fire were shot near the U.S. Embassy in Quito, with no injuries or damage reported. According to National Police assigned to the Embassy, a white Suzuki with four occupants made three turns around the traffic circle across the street from the compound. As the vehicle started to head away, one of its occupants fired the shots. Police returned fire but is not known if any of the occupants were harmed. The incident reportedly occurred on the "Day of the Guerrilla" in Quito, during a weeklong conference of guerrilla groups.
December 31, 1989 – one vehicle was destroyed and another damaged by two explosive devices which were thrown over the wall of the commissary/motorpool of the US Embassy, detonating 10 seconds apart from each other. The motorpool was located some 200 yards from the Embassy. The next day, an explosive device was found at the U.S. Ambassador's residence property. The device was similar to the ones used in the attack the previous day, and may had been thrown over the perimeter wall during New Year's night. The attacks occurred in a context of worldwide condemnation and protest over the United States invasion of Panama.

1990s
January 16, 1991 – in the context of demonstrations against Operation Desert Storm happening that day in Guayaquil, a Mormon church was bombed with only material damage as result. No claims of responsibility were made. Then, during an evening antiwar demonstration at 8:30 p.m., a small explosion occurred near a branch of Citibank, shattering several of the bank's windows.
January 22, 1991 – two Mormon churches were bombed by unknown individuals in the coastal cities of Portoviejo and Guayaquil, causing damages of over $2,000 in the former and $1,400 in the latter.
February 18 and 25, 1991 – unknown attackers bombed Mormon churches in Esmeraldas (a coastal city) and Riobamba (a mountain city), causing damages amounting to nearly $400 in the former and $250 in the latter.
August 4, 1993 – a hoax bomb was placed by unknown individuals at the USAID building in Quito. A small passenger van reportedly parked in the back of the building, and one of the vehicle's five male passengers distracted the local guard with conversation. The driver exited the van though did not approach the gate. When the van left, the guard found a package lay against the security Delta barrier with a note that read: "The next time for real pig American imperialists." The package was immediately examined by US Embassy security personnel and local bomb technicians, initially appearing to contain 15 dynamite sticks with two blasting caps connected with wire to a black box detonator. However, a later examination of the device found that the dynamite sticks were actually filled with dirt to give it a weight similar to that of dynamite. Additionally, the black box was in reality a cassette tape container wrapped in black tape with two wires coming from it. The wires were attached to what appeared to be the top of two blasting caps inserted into the dynamite. Police failed to find suspects and no responsibility was claimed.
November 25, 1993 – ten men dressed in military fatigues attempted to kidnap Leonard Schorsch, an American citizen employed at American Minga oil firm, working near Shushufindi, in the Ecuadorian jungle canton of the same name. Assailants knocked at the Schorsch's residence door, but one of the bodyguards who answered the door saw the men and found that their hair was too long for them to be regular Armed Forces members. A 30-minute shootout between the bodyguards and the attackers followed, with the attacking group reportedly armed with Uzi submachine guns. During the shootout, an explosive device was hurled to the roof of the house so to induce Schorsch to come out. Two terrorists were allegedly killed during the attack before Schorsch was rescued by a military helicopter and evacuated to the city of Lago Agrio, and finally to Quito. Four of the attackers were arrested, among them two Colombians who may have been FARC members. The attackers may had been responsible for a series of kidnappings and bus robberies in the Lago Agrio area.

2000s
February 16, 2000– a tiny bomb hidden in a videotape wounded journalist Rafael Cuesta, news editor of Telecentro television network in Guayaquil. The network had been previously threatened by a self-styled "National Liberation Army" (NLA) in order to coerce it into changing its alleged pro-governmental perspective. While authorities believed that the NLA could have been responsible, the PCG also claimed responsibility. Days after this attack, on February 21 in Guayaquil, the PCG claimed responsibility for another videocassette bomb mailed to Marcos Murillo, leader of the Evangelical Indians of Ecuador, but the bomb was found and defused by the police.
May 29, 2005 A low power bomb blast during a military parade in the city of Macas, Morona Santiago, Ecuador. The attack only lefta few material damages, and the Comando Revolucionario Amazónico (Revolutionary Amazonic Command in spanish) claimed the attack.
2009– a television station was bombed by the Guerrilla Army of the People N-15.

2010s
November 22, 2010 – an undetonated bomb was discovered at the office of the rector at the University of Guayaquil. The Popular Combatants Group (PCG), which had been dormant for several years, claimed responsibility for the bomb.
November 17, 2011 – an improvised explosive device (IED) exploded in the Ministry of Labor building in Quito.
November 22, 2011 – three pamphlet bombs, using explosives under a large number of pamphlets in order to physically disseminate them, exploded in Guayaquil. The Guerrilla Army of the People N-15 and the Revolutionary Insurgent Armed Forces of Ecuador claimed responsibility for the first two bombs. No group claimed responsibility for the third.
December 19, 2011 – three separate pamphlet bombs exploded in Guayaquil, Quito and Cuenca. No group claimed responsibility.
 January 27, 2018 – a car bomb exploded outside a police station in the town of San Lorenzo, on the border with Colombia, wrecking the station, damaging other houses in the area, and leaving 28 people with minor injuries. FARC dissidents were likely behind the attack. This is the first attack of this type in the history of Ecuador.

2020s
 August 14, 2022 – an explosion in Guayaquil that killed five and injured many others was ascribed to organized crime gangs.

See also

 Crime in Ecuador

References

 
Ecuador
Human rights abuses in Ecuador